Inventec Corporation is a Taiwan-based Original Design Manufacturer (ODM) making notebook computers, servers and mobile devices. Originally established in 1975 to develop and manufacture electronic calculators, major customers include Hewlett-Packard, Toshiba, Acer, and Fujitsu-Siemens.

Inventec Corporation has major development and manufacturing facilities in China and is one of their largest exporters.  The company opened its first development center in China in 1991 and its first manufacturing facility in Shanghai in 1995.  In addition, the company has configuration, and service centers in the United States, Europe, and Mexico. 

The company has a workforce of over 23,000 employees, including over 3,000 engineers. It partially owns a Japan-based mini notebook brand vendor, Kohjinsha (KJS), which was established in Yokohama.

Group information 
Inventec Group comprises five companies:

Inventec Corporation 
Noted above

Inventec BESTA 

BESTA is an independent subsidiary company of the Inventec Group first launched in Taipei in 1989 to produce compact English/Chinese electronic dictionaries. BESTA has expanded its product line to PDAs, tablet computers and translators in multiple languages (including Korean and Japanese).  
 
BESTA currently produces over 30 models on the market in Taiwan, China, Thailand, Malaysia, Indonesia, and Singapore. The Thai distributor CyberDict offers customized products with additional Thai dictionaries.

BESTA also manufactures a line of language products designed specifically for the North American market, where it has become the leading provider of English/Chinese and English/Korean electronic dictionaries. In the US, BESTA products are sold under the BESTA (Chinese) or OPTIMEC (South Korean) labels and are exclusively distributed and serviced by Moy Sam Corporation (New York) and Maxmile Corporation (Los Angeles).  In Canada, BESTA products are found in Toronto and Markham.

Several BESTA models come with slots for inserting SD/MMC data cards containing additional specialized dictionaries (such as medical or business). It has been ranked in 1st place for "Taiwan's Ideal Electronic Dictionary Brand" for twelve consecutive years. Inventec Besta became a listed company in Taiwan Stock Exchange in 2007.

Key Development of Inventec Besta Co:

Year 1989—Inventec Besta Co., Ltd was founded.

Year 1999—Merged with the Inventec's References System Division, Lin Kou Factory, and Inventec (Xi'an) Company

Year 2000—Acquired Golden Atom Holdings Ltd. and invested in Besta Technology (HK) Co., Ltd.and Besta Technology (China) Co., Ltd

Inventec Micro-Electronics

Inventec Appliance Corporation

Tablets 
 Amazon Kindle Fire
 Barnes & Noble Nook
 N18C (Dr.Eye)
 Lyon

Mobile phones 
 OKWAP
 J98
 PHS-I99
 PHS-PG900
 PHS-PG901
 PHS-I92
 PHS-i501

See also 
 List of companies of Taiwan

References

1975 establishments in Taiwan
Electronics companies of Taiwan
Mobile phone manufacturers
Companies based in Taipei
Electronics companies established in 1975